The 1949 FA Charity Shield was the 27th FA Charity Shield, a pre-season exhibition football match between the winners of the previous season's First Division and FA Cup titles. The match took place at Highbury, London, between the league champions Portsmouth and FA Cup winners Wolverhampton Wanderers. The score finished at 1–1, marking the first draw in the Charity Shield and meaning the Shield was shared.

Match details

See also
The Football League 1948–49
FA Cup 1948–49

References

FA Community Shield
Charity Shield
Charity Shield 1949
Charity Shield 1949
Charity Shield
Charity Shield